The Presses Universitaires de Rennes or PUR (Rennes University Press) is the largest French university press. Founded in 1984, PUR publishes around 200 books every year. It is located in Rennes in Brittany on the Rennes 2 University's La Harpe Campus. It belongs to this university but also publishes for other universities gathered in the Réseau des Université de l'Ouest Atlantique (University of Western Brittany, University of Southern Brittany, University of Rennes 1, University of Nantes, University of Angers, University of Maine (France), the University of La Rochelle and the François Rabelais University in Tours).

External links 
 official website

Mass media in Rennes
Rennes
Rennes
Publishing companies established in 1984
1984 establishments in France